Ney Marques de Sousa is a Brazilian former professional footballer who played as a midfielder. He made 21 appearances in the NASL with the Washington Whips and Washington Diplomats.

Career statistics

References

Brazilian footballers
Brazilian expatriate footballers
Association football midfielders
Clube Atlético Mineiro players
Washington Whips players
Washington Diplomats (NASL) players
North American Soccer League (1968–1984) players
Expatriate soccer players in the United States
Brazilian expatriate sportspeople in the United States
Year of birth missing
Year of death missing